Peter Joseph Ferraro (born January 24, 1973) is an American former professional ice hockey forward who played in the  National Hockey League (NHL). He and his twin brother Chris became the second set of identical twins to play on the same NHL team, (the New York Rangers) in the 1995–1996 NHL hockey season. The first was Ron and Rich Sutter.

Playing career
Ferraro was born in Port Jefferson, New York. As a youth, he and his brother Chris played in the 1985, 1986 and 1987 Quebec International Pee-Wee Hockey Tournaments with the Philadelphia Flyers and New York Rangers minor ice hockey teams.

He was the first of the twins to be drafted into the NHL, and was drafted in the first round (#24 overall) in the 1992 NHL Entry Draft by the New York Rangers.

During his NHL career, he played for the New York Rangers, the Pittsburgh Penguins, Boston Bruins and the Washington Capitals. Despite playing professional hockey for a combined thirty years, neither Ferraro managed to play over 100 NHL games. Peter has a career NHL total of 92 games played while his brother Chris played 74 NHL games.

Both brothers played for the DEG Metro Stars of the DEL in the 2005–06 season.  Ferraro has signed a contract with the New York Islanders and attended the team's 2006–07 training camp.  As he had previously indicated, he accepted a position with the team's minor league club, the Bridgeport Sound Tigers, as he failed to make the NHL team. On March 27, 2009, the Las Vegas Wranglers announced that Ferraro had been suspended for the remainder of the regular season and playoffs due to Ferraro spearing another player after an on-ice brawl. During that same brawl, his brother Chris had suffered a broken leg, which also ended his season and career. On April 1, 2009 he was released from the Las Vegas Wranglers.

The brothers were inducted into the Suffolk Sports Hall of Fame on Long Island in the Hockey Category with the Class of 2012.

Personal
Ferraro currently runs Ferraro Brothers Elite Hockey with his brother Chris at Newbridge Ice Arena in Bellmore, NY. He was a finalist for the 2012 Portland Pirates Hall Of Fame.

Earlier, he and his brothers built the Twin Rinks facility at Nassau County's Eisenhower Park. But cost overruns led to its bankruptcy in 2015, and the Islanders purchased it to serve as their practice facility.

Career statistics

Regular season and playoffs

International

Awards and honours

References

External links
 

1973 births
Living people
American men's ice hockey right wingers
American people of Italian descent
Binghamton Rangers players
Boston Bruins players
Bridgeport Sound Tigers players
DEG Metro Stars players
Dubuque Fighting Saints players
Hartford Wolf Pack players
Ice hockey players from New York (state)
Ice hockey players at the 1994 Winter Olympics
Las Vegas Wranglers players
Maine Black Bears men's ice hockey players
National Hockey League first-round draft picks
New York Islanders players
New York Rangers draft picks
New York Rangers players
Olympic ice hockey players of the United States
People from Port Jefferson, New York
Pittsburgh Penguins players
Portland Pirates players
Providence Bruins players
Södertälje SK players
Springfield Falcons players
Syracuse Crunch players
American twins
Twin sportspeople
Washington Capitals players
Waterloo Black Hawks players
NCAA men's ice hockey national champions